Stuart Davis or Stewart or Davies may refer to:

 Stuart Davis (golfer) (born 1973), English golfer
 Stuart Davis (musician) (born 1971), American musician and songwriter
 Stuart Davis (album)
 Stuart Davis (painter) (1892–1964), American modernist painter
 Stuart Davis (rugby league) (born 1961), Australian rugby league player
 Stuart Davies (rugby union) (born 1965), Welsh rugby union footballer
 Stuart Davies (engineer) (1906–1995), designer of the Avro Vulcan
 Stewart Davies, former chairman of Darlington F.C.
 Stewart Davies (bowls) (born 1955), Australian lawn and indoor bowler